Mediterranean Sports Palace is an arena in Almería, Spain.  It is primarily used for indoor sports and was one of the main venues for the 2005 Mediterranean Games. The arena holds 5,000 people and was opened in 2004. The arena is the regular home venue of CV Almería volleyball team.

External links
Venue information

Indoor arenas in Spain
Sports venues in Andalusia